is a 2013 Japanese animated film produced by OLM, Inc. and distributed by Toho. The film was directed by Kunihiko Yuyama and written by Hideki Sonoda. Its the 16th animated film in the  Pokémon franchise created by Satoshi Tajiri, Junichi Masuda and Ken Sugimori.

The film follows a conflict involving a group of Genesect and a single Mewtwo, both human-engineered members of a species of creatures called Pokémon, and the wild Pokémon inhabitants of a nature park the Genesect forcibly try to take over to make their new home.

The film premiered in Japan on July 13, 2013.

Plot 
The Pokémon trainers Ash Ketchum, Iris, and Cilan visit Pokémon Hills, a nature park surrounded by a city. While there, Ash quickly befriends a lost Genesect, a Pokémon that people brought back to life from fossils after being extinct for 300 million years. Ash offers to help the Genesect get back to its home. A red Genesect attacks Ash and forces the friendly Genesect to attack him as well. Mewtwo, another Pokémon created by people, blocks the attack, saving Ash, Cilan, and Iris's lives. The Genesect, not realizing the humans survived, leave.

That night, five Genesect take over the center of Pokémon Hills, driving out the other Pokémon and building a giant nest near some Panna Lotuses (a flower that existed in their home 300 million years ago) to turn it into their new home. This threatens the substation under Pokémon Hills, along with the city's power supply. Mewtwo, having been told about the Genesect's rampage, appears. Mewtwo tells the red Genesect not to hurt the other Pokémon, but it refuses to listen, and the two embark on a high-speed chase around the city.

Meanwhile, the Pokémon native to Pokémon Hills fight the three Genesect and begin to overwhelm them. The red Genesect then returns to protect them. The friendly Genesect saves Ash by taking an attack from the other Genesect, causing it to collapse. Mewtwo fights the four remaining Genesect and gains the upper hand. However, in the process the nest is set on fire.

Ash's Oshawott, together with the Pokémon of Pokémon Hills, help to put out the flames, and save three of the Genesect, who realize that the other Pokémon are not their enemies and save Ash from a falling beam. Ash, along with the four Genesect other than the red Genesect, run between Mewtwo and the red Genesect to stop them from fighting. The red Genesect claims that they are all its enemies and fires an attack, but Mewtwo blocks it takes it into space. In awe of the beauty it originated from, the red Genesect realizes that all people and Pokémon are friends. Unable to survive there, Mewtwo and the red Genesect begin to fall. Oshawott and the wild Pokémon create a giant ball of water to cushion Mewtwo and the red Genesect's fall. By morning, Eric restores the power.

Ash realizes that the perfect place for the Genesect to live is Absentia National Park, the only place where Panna Lotuses still grow naturally. Ash, Iris, Cilan, and Eric take the Genesect there, where they start building another nest.

Cast

Regular characters

Guest characters 
 : An ancient Pokémon revived by Team Plasma. They are initially responsible for some events in the anime TV series.  Team Plasma "enhanced" it by having a cannon installed onto its back that can be equipped with several elemental cassettes known as "Drives" (Burn Drive, Shock Drive, Chill Drive, Douse Drive), which changes the type of its signature move Techno Blast. It can also fly at high speeds by transforming into a High-Speed Flight Form. In the original Japanese release, the Genesect are voiced by Koichi Yamadera, Sumire Morohoshi, Akeno Watanabe, Kiyotaka Furushima, and Kensuke Satō.
 : A successful clone of Mew made by Mew's fossil, it is said to be the most powerful Pokémon in existence. This Mewtwo is an entirely different individual from the one that appeared previously in Pokémon films, possessing a female voice and distinct personality traits in comparison to the original Mewtwo. In the English dub, Miriam Pultro provides the voice.
 : Is a park ranger who works at Pokémon Hills in New Tork City and a Guest character from the movie. Eric's voice in the original Japanese release is provided by Takashi Yoshimura.

Production

Development 
Moviegoers could receive Genesect in copies of the Pokémon Black, White, Pokémon Black 2, or White 2 video games at theaters from January 11 to February 20, 2013.

The film's setting is based on New York City, much like the Black, White, Black 2, and White 2 games, with Central Park as a key location. Director Kunihiko Yuyama stated that this was chosen to contrast a modern city with the wild and ancient nature of Genesect. A special episode of the anime serving as a prologue to the film aired on TV Tokyo, titled .

Music 
The film's ending song is titled , performed by the J-pop group Ikimono-gakari.

Release

Theatrical release
The film was released in Japan on July 13, 2013 by Toho.

Broadcast airing
The film premiered in the United Kingdom on CITV and in the United States on Cartoon Network on October 19, 2013.

The movie premiered in India as Pokemon Movie: Genesect Aur Mewtwo: Ek Shandaar Kahani on Hungama TV on November 7, 2020 at 9:15 A.M.

Reception

Box office 
In its opening weekend, the film debuted #2 on the Japanese box office with $4,901,163. As of September 8, 2013, the film grossed $30,906,537 in Japan and $1,386,840 in South Korea, as of January 12, 2014,  for a worldwide total of $32,293,377. It was the 10th highest-grossing film of the year in Japan.

Critical reception 
Rebecca Silverman of Anime News Network gave the dub an overall grade of B, describing the film as "a very dark film in such a kid-friendly franchise", and praised the film's animation, but stated: " Ash and his pals serve very little point ... at least they're still less extraneous than Team Rocket, who really could have been left out of the film." She concluded that the film "is cinematic in the scope of its art, pays attention to some of the darker aspects of the franchise's world, and as usual showcases a variety of interesting creatures against lovely backgrounds."

Notes

References

External links 
  
 
 
 

2013 films
2013 anime films
2010s Japanese-language films
Genesect and the Legend Awakened
Japanese sequel films
Toho animated films
Viz Media anime
Films about genetic engineering
Films directed by Kunihiko Yuyama
Films scored by Shinji Miyazaki
Films set in New York City
OLM, Inc. animated films